Vola may refer to:

People 
 Vola Vale (1897–1970), American actress
 François Vola (born 1953), French guitarist and composer
 Louis Vola (1902–1990), French double-bassist
 Vicki Vola (1916–1985), American actress

Bands 
 Vola (band), a Danish/Swedish rock band
 Vola and the Oriental Machine, a Japanese rock band

Other uses 
 Voľa, a municipality in eastern Slovakia
 Alfa Romeo Vola, a concept car

See also 
 Valo (disambiguation)
 Volo (disambiguation)